Pauline "Polly" Whittier (December 9, 1876 – March 3, 1946) was an American golfer who competed in the 1900 Summer Olympics. She was born in Boston, Massachusetts. Whittier won the silver medal in the women's competition. She was a daughter of Col. Charles A. Whittier, and in 1904 she married Ernest Iselin, son of Adrian Iselin Jr.

References

External links

 

American female golfers
Amateur golfers
Golfers at the 1900 Summer Olympics
Olympic silver medalists for the United States in golf
Medalists at the 1900 Summer Olympics
Golfers from Massachusetts
Sportspeople from Boston
1876 births
1946 deaths
Iselin family